Open House is a 1964 BBC TV series presented by Gay Byrne, Peter Haigh and Robert Robinson.

References

External links

BBC Television shows
English-language television shows
1964 British television series debuts
1964 British television series endings